The following outline is provided as an overview of and topical guide to Hong Kong:

Hong Kong – one of two special administrative regions of China, the other being Macau. The territory lies on the eastern side of the Pearl River Delta, bordering Guangdong province in the north and facing the South China Sea in the east, west and south. Beginning as a trading port in the 19th century, Hong Kong has developed into one of the world's leading financial centres.

Hong Kong was a Crown colony of the United Kingdom from 1842 to 1981 and was a British dependent territory from 1981 until the transfer of its sovereignty to the People's Republic of China in 1997. The Sino-British Joint Declaration and the Basic Law of Hong Kong stipulate that Hong Kong operate with a high degree of autonomy until at least 2047, fifty years after the transfer.

Under the “one country, two systems” policy, the Central People's Government is responsible for the territory's defence and foreign affairs, while the Government of Hong Kong is responsible for its own legal system, police force, monetary system, customs policy, immigration policy, and delegates to international organisations and events.

General reference

 Pronunciation: 
 Common English country name: Hong Kong
 Official English country name:  The Hong Kong Special Administrative Region of the People's Republic of China
 Common endonym(s):  
 Official endonym(s):  
 Adjectives: Hong Kong, Hongkonger
 Demonym(s): Hongkonger, Hongkongese
 Etymology: Refer to Name of Hong Kong.
 International rankings of Hong Kong
 ISO country codes: HK, HKG, 344
 ISO region codes: See ISO 3166-2:HK
 Internet country code top-level domain: .hk

Geography of Hong Kong 

 Hong Kong is: de jure, a Chinese special administrative region
 Location:
 Northern Hemisphere and Eastern Hemisphere
 Eurasia
 Asia
 East Asia
 Pearl River Delta
 Time zone:  Hong Kong Time (UTC+08)
 Extreme points of Hong Kong
 High:  Tai Mo Shan 
 Low:  South China Sea 0 m
 Population of Hong Kong: 7,108,100 (June 30, 2011) 
 Area of Hong Kong: 1,104 km2
 Atlas of Hong Kong

Environment of Hong Kong 

 Climate of Hong Kong
 Renewable energy in Hong Kong
 Geology of Hong Kong
 Protected areas of Hong Kong
 Biosphere reserves in Hong Kong
 National parks of Hong Kong
 Wildlife of Hong Kong
 Fauna of Hong Kong
 Birds of Hong Kong
 Mammals of Hong Kong

Natural geographic features of Hong Kong 

 Glaciers of Hong Kong: none
 Islands of Hong Kong
 Lakes of Hong Kong
 Mountains of Hong Kong
 Volcanoes in Hong Kong: none
 Rivers of Hong Kong
 World Heritage Sites in Hong Kong: None

Regions of Hong Kong

Ecoregions of Hong Kong

Administrative divisions of Hong Kong 

 Districts of Hong Kong

Districts of Hong Kong

Municipalities of Hong Kong 
 Capital of Hong Kong: Hong Kong Central
 Cities of Hong Kong

Demography of Hong Kong

Government and politics of Hong Kong 

Politics of Hong Kong
 Form of government:
 Capital of Hong Kong: Hong Kong Central
 Elections in Hong Kong

 Political parties in Hong Kong
 Taxation in Hong Kong
 Transfer of sovereignty of Hong Kong
 Hong Kong handover ceremony

Branches of the government of Hong Kong 

Government of Hong Kong

Executive branch of the government of Hong Kong 
 Head of state and Head of government: Chief Executive of Hong Kong, Donald Tsang
 Cabinet of Hong Kong
 Government departments and agencies in Hong Kong
 Department of Health
 Department of Justice
 Immigration Department
 Customs and Excise Department
 Food and Environmental Hygiene Department
 Leisure and Cultural Services Department
 Housing Department
 More...

Legislative branch of the government of Hong Kong 

 Legislative Council (unicameral)
 President of the Legislative Council (Speaker): Andrew Leung

Judicial branch of the government of Hong Kong 

Judiciary of Hong Kong
 Department of Justice
 Court of Final Appeal
 High Court
 Court of Appeal
 Court of First Instance
 District Court
 Magistrates' court

Foreign relations of Hong Kong 

Foreign relations of Hong Kong
 Diplomatic missions in Hong Kong

International organization membership 

International organization membership of Hong Kong
The Hong Kong Special Administrative Region is a member of:

Asian Development Bank (ADB)
Asia-Pacific Economic Cooperation (APEC)
Bank for International Settlements (BIS)
International Chamber of Commerce (ICC)
International Hydrographic Organization (IHO)
International Maritime Organization (IMO) (associate)
International Monetary Fund (IMF)
International Olympic Committee (IOC)
International Organization for Standardization (ISO) (correspondent)

International Trade Union Confederation (ITUC)
Universal Postal Union (UPU)
World Confederation of Labour (WCL)
World Customs Organization (WCO)
World Federation of Trade Unions (WFTU)
World Meteorological Organization (WMO)
World Tourism Organization (UNWTO) (associate)
World Trade Organization (WTO)

Law and order in Hong Kong 

Law of Hong Kong

 Hong Kong Basic Law
 Hong Kong Basic Law Article 23
 Hong Kong Basic Law Article 45
 Hong Kong Basic Law Article 46
 Hong Kong Basic Law Article 69
 Hong Kong Basic Law Annex Two
 Hong Kong trade mark law
 Hong Kong copyright law
 Legislation of the Provisional Government of Hong Kong
 Alcohol laws of Hong Kong
 Capital punishment in Hong Kong
 Constitution of Hong Kong
 Crime in Hong Kong
 Organized crime in Hong Kong
 Prostitution in Hong Kong
 Human trafficking in Hong Kong
 Human rights in Hong Kong
 Hong Kong Human Rights Monitor
 Hong Kong 1 July marches
 December 2005 protest for democracy in Hong Kong
 Internet censorship in Hong Kong
 LGBT rights in Hong Kong
 Freedom of religion in Hong Kong
 Law enforcement in Hong Kong
 Department of Justice
 Hong Kong Police Force
 Commissioner of Police: Stephen Lo Wai-chung

Military of Hong Kong 

Military of Hong Kong
 Command
 Commander of the People's Liberation Army Hong Kong Garrison
 Forces
 People's Liberation Army Hong Kong Garrison
 Military history of Hong Kong

Local government in Hong Kong 

Districts of Hong Kong
 District Councils of Hong Kong

History of Hong Kong 

History of Hong Kong
 Military history of Hong Kong

Culture of Hong Kong 

Culture of Hong Kong
 LGBT culture in Hong Kong
 LGBT history in Hong Kong
 LGBT rights in Hong Kong
 Architecture of Hong Kong
 Cuisine of Hong Kong
 Languages of Hong Kong
 Media in Hong Kong
 National symbols of Hong Kong
 Emblem of Hong Kong
 Flag of Hong Kong
 National anthem of Hong Kong
 People of Hong Kong
 Indonesians in Hong Kong
 Thais in Hong Kong
 Foreign domestic helpers in Hong Kong
 Prostitution in Hong Kong
 Public holidays in Hong Kong
 Religion in Hong Kong
 Buddhism in Hong Kong
 Christianity in Hong Kong
 Hinduism in Hong Kong
 Islam in Hong Kong
 Judaism in Hong Kong
 World Heritage Sites in Hong Kong: None

Art in Hong Kong 
 Art in Hong Kong see also :category:Hong Kong artists.
 Cinema of Hong Kong
 Hong Kong Lesbian & Gay Film Festival
 Literature of Hong Kong
 Music of Hong Kong
 Television in Hong Kong

Sports in Hong Kong 

Sports in Hong Kong
 Football in Hong Kong

Economy and infrastructure of Hong Kong 

Economy of Hong Kong
 Economic rank, by nominal GDP: 42nd (IMF 2022)
 Agriculture in Hong Kong
 Banking in Hong Kong
 National Bank of Hong Kong
 Communications in Hong Kong
 Internet in Hong Kong
 Companies of Hong Kong
 Currency of Hong Kong: Dollar
 ISO 4217: HKD
 Energy in Hong Kong
 Health care in Hong Kong
 Mining in Hong Kong
 Hong Kong Stock Exchange
 Tourism in Hong Kong
 Transport in Hong Kong
 Airports in Hong Kong
 Rail transport in Hong Kong
 Roads in Hong Kong
 Taxicabs of Hong Kong
 Water supply and sanitation in Hong Kong

Education in Hong Kong 

Education in Hong Kong

Health in Hong Kong 

Health in Hong Kong

See also 

Hong Kong–Taiwan relations
Index of Hong Kong-related articles
List of Hong Kong-related topics
List of international rankings
Outline of Asia
Outline of China
Outline of geography
Place names of Hong Kong

References

Hong Kong Travel

External links

 Government
 GovHK - Official government site
 Hong Kong Government - Census and Statistics Department
 Hong Kong Government - Fact Sheets
 Hong Kong Legislative Council - Official site of the legislative body
 DiscoverHongKong - Official site of the Hong Kong Tourism Board

 General reference
 Hong Kong entry at The World Factbook
 Encyclopædia Britannica entry on Hong Kong

 Miscellanea
 
 
 
 

Outlines of cities
Wikipedia outlines
Outlines of countries